The 233 Spanish Martyrs, also referred to as The Martyrs of Valencia  or
Jose Aparico Sanz and 232 Companions, were a group of martyrs from the Spanish Civil War, who were beatified in March 2001 by Pope John Paul II. This was the largest number of persons beatified at once up to that time. They originated from all parts of Spain but mostly served and died in the diocese of Valencia.

Background
The 233 martyrs were clergy, religious and lay persons of the diocese of Valencia who were executed during the Red Terror of the Spanish Civil War. Some 6,000 clergy and religious were executed in Spain during this period; of these over 2,000 have been proposed for canonization.  They are regarded by the Roman Catholic Church as Martyrs of the Spanish Civil War.

The 233 martyrs were made up of 16 separate causes, mostly groups but also some individuals who have been proposed for canonization. The earliest cause was opened in 1952 (that of Tomas Sitjar Fortia and his companions). Most causes were opened in the 1950s, though none were accepted by the CCS until 1990. The most recent cause (Maria Giner Gomis) was opened in 1995 and completed in five years. This was not the first group of Spanish martyrs beatified by John Paul II, though it was the largest up to that time.

Ceremony
The beatifications were announced at a ceremony in Rome on 11 March 2001, presided over by Pope John Paul II.
In his homily he preached on the Transfiguration and pointed to the example of the martyr's sacrifice, and urged the church in Spain to be worthy of their example. He observed that they were men and women of all ages, and states (clergy, religious, lay persons) and that they had been killed for professing their faith.
He pointed out that the martyrs had died forgiving their enemies, and expressed the hope that their example would help to remove the end of hatred and resentment still felt in Spain from those times.

Controversy
The issue of the Spanish martyrs is controversial, not least because of the Spanish churches identification with the Nationalist cause during the civil war.
However John Paul pointed out, generally and in specifics, that those who died in these cases “were not involved in political or ideological struggles nor did they want to be concerned with them” and that “they died solely for religious motives”.

Individuals 
John Paul II made special mention of Maria Teresa Ferragud, one of the lay companions from Valencia; an  83-year-old woman, she was executed along with her four daughters (companions of Aurelio Ample Alcaide), all nuns in contemplative orders. He also made special mention of Francesco Castello Aleu, a 22 yr old layman, and German Gozalba, at age 23 just 2 months into the priesthood.
He also made reference to Consuela and Maria Dolores Aguiar-Mella, two lay companions of Maria Baldilou Bullit, and the first people from Uruguay to be beatified.

The 233 martyrs
The 233 martyrs were advanced in 16 separate causes :
 Jose Aparicio Sanz and 73 companions, clergy and laypersons of the Diocese of Valencia, including Amalia Abad Casasempere 
 Jacinto Serrano Lopez and 19 companions of the Dominican Order
 Pascual Fortuna Almela and 4 companions of the Friars Minor
 Alfonso Lopez Lopez and 6 companions of the Friars Minor Conventual
 Aurelio Ample Alcaide and 16 companions of the Friars Minor Capuchin,
 Josefa Masia Ferragud, a nun of the Discalced Augustinians
 Tomas Sitjar Fortia and 11 companions of the Society of Jesus
 Jose Calasanz Marques and 28 companions of the Salesian Society, and two Daughters of Mary
 Vicente Cabanes Badenas and 18 companions of the Third Order of Friars Minor Capuchin
 Mariano García Méndez (Juan María de la Cruz), a priest of the Sacred Heart of Jesus
 Leonardo Olivera Buera and 5 companions of the  Christian Brothers, also 24 Carmelite Sisters of Charity
 Maria Ricart Olmos, a nun of the Servite Order
 Maria Baldillou Bullit and 5 companions, nuns of the Sisters of the Pious Schools, and 2 laywomen of that order
 Josefa Ruano Garcia and Dolores Puig Bonany, nuns of the Little Sisters of the Abandoned Elderly
 Victoria Quintana Argos and 2 companions of the Capuchin Tertiary Sisters of the Holy Family
 Maria Giner Gomis, a Claretian Sister
 Francisco Castello y Aleu, layman of Catholic Action in Lleida

Notes

References
  Martyrs of Valencia, at gcatholic
 Homily by John Paul II

External links
 Martyrs of Spain, index page

Martyrs of the Spanish Civil War
20th-century venerated Christians
Spanish beatified people
Lists of Christian martyrs
Groups of Christian martyrs of the Late Modern era
Roman Catholic child blesseds
Executed children
History of Catholicism in Spain
Martyred groups
Martyred Roman Catholic priests
Groups of Roman Catholic saints
Persecution of Christians
Red Terror (Spain)
Beatifications by Pope John Paul II